Aveley Secondary College is an Independent public co-educational  high day school, located in the Perth suburb of Ellenbrook, just north of Aveley, Western Australia.

Overview
Large population growth in Ellenbrook and surrounding suburbs caused there to be a need for another secondary school in the Ellenbrook area in the early 2010's. The only other secondary school in the area was Ellenbrook Secondary College, which opened in 2007, and was predicted to have enrolment in excess of 2000 students if another school did not open in the area. In 2013, the state Liberal government promised to build a school in northern Ellenbrook by 2017. In December 2013, the opening date for the new school was revised to the start of 2018.

In February 2018, Aveley Secondary College opened for Year 7 students, with each year increasing in the number of year groups until 2023, when the school will have its first Year 12's. Further construction started in December 2019 to build more classrooms, which are now available to the students as of 2021.

Local intake area
Aveley Secondary College's local intake area covers part of Aveley, Baskerville, most of Belhus, Brigadoon, part of Ellenbrook, Millendon, The Vines and Upper Swan. Students living in the local intake area have a guaranteed place at the school if they apply. Students living outside the local intake area can apply as well, but they will be accepted on a case by case basis.

Student numbers

See also

 List of schools in the Perth metropolitan area

References

Public high schools in Perth, Western Australia
Educational institutions established in 2018
2018 establishments in Australia
Ellenbrook, Western Australia